Torunlar may refer to:

Places
Torunlar, Uğurludağ, village in the Uğurludağ District of Çorum Province in Turkey

People with the surname
Kutlu Torunlar (born 1968), Turkish windsurfer